BofA Securities, Inc., previously Bank of America Merrill Lynch (BAML), is an American multinational investment banking division under the auspices of Bank of America. It is not to be confused with Merrill, the stock brokerage and trading platform subsidiary of Bank of America.

It provides services in mergers and acquisitions, equity and debt capital markets, lending, trading, risk management, research, and liquidity and payments management. It was formed through the combination of the corporate and investment banking activities of Bank of America and Merrill Lynch & Co. following the acquisition of the latter by the former in January 2009.

History
Bank of America completed the acquisition of Merrill Lynch & Co on January 1, 2009. Bank of America began rebranding all of its corporate and investment banking activities under the Bank of America Merrill Lynch name in September 2009.

In April 2011, Bank of America Merrill Lynch integrated its corporate and investment banking operations into a single division.

In October 2013, Bank of America Merrill Lynch was recognized as the Most Innovative Investment Bank of the Year in The Banker's Investment Banking Awards.

In February 2019, Bank of America announced a rebrand of its investment banking division to "BofA Securities".

Operations
Bank of America Merrill Lynch is organized within four geographic divisions:

 Asia Pacific - Headquartered at Cheung Kong Center in Hong Kong
 Europe, Middle East & Africa - Headquartered at Bank of America Merrill Lynch Financial Centre in London
 Latin America and U.S. & Canada - Headquartered at Bank of America Tower, New York (also the global head office) The institution also maintains a large presence at the Bank of America Tower in Jacksonville

Market share
Bank of America Merrill Lynch achieved the second-highest revenues of any investment bank worldwide in 2010, with a global market share of 6.8 per cent. In that year it achieved the highest revenues of any investment bank worldwide in both leveraged loans and asset-backed securities.

In 2011, Bank of America Merrill Lynch again achieved the second-highest revenues of any investment bank worldwide (after J.P. Morgan & Co.), with a global market share of 7.4 per cent.

References

External links
Official site
Decommissioned official site with redirect links

Bank of America
Merrill (company)
Primary dealers
American companies established in 2009
Financial services companies established in 2009
Banks established in 2009
Investment banks in the United States
Banks based in New York City
2009 establishments in New York City